(3 July 1900 – 12 April 1990) was a Japanese poet and film critic. While born in Shiga Prefecture, he was raised in Manchukuo in China due to his father's work on the South Manchurian Railway, and then graduated from Tokyo University. He began publishing his own poetry in Manchukuo in 1924 and his work was influenced by that colonial context. His work was praised by Riichi Yokomitsu, and he became a prominent figure in modernist poetry in Japan, pursuing especially prose poetry. Kitagawa was also a well-known film critic, one who especially praised the work of Mansaku Itami (the father of Juzo Itami), calling it a new, realistic "prose cinema" (sanbun eiga) in opposition to the old "poetic cinema" (inbun eiga) of Sadao Yamanaka, Daisuke Itō, and others. He was a champion of neorealism in the postwar era.

He was a standard-bearer of the Scenario-Literature-Movement. He, Shuzo Takiguchi, Akira Asano and other members formed a group called 'Ten Scenario-Researchers'. They advocated the movement from a standpoint considering a scenario a literary genre.

See also
Lesescenario — Kitagawa referred to Lesescenario in his books Reports on Pure Cinema (Junsui Eiga ki 純粋映画記 1936 ) and Charms of Scenarios (Shinario no miryoku シナリオの魅力)
Motojiro Kajii admired Kitagawa's poetry
Iku Takenaka
The True Story of Ah Q: He dramatized it in screenplay form

References

External links
paper on Kitagawa's <full length epic> :focusing on the connection with scenario by Taiwanese researcher Yi-ching Tsai

Japanese film critics
1900 births
1990 deaths
People from Shiga Prefecture
20th-century Japanese poets